Foto di gruppo is the second studio album by the Italian rapper Bassi Maestro, released in 1998 under Vibrarecords.

Track listing

Link 

1998 albums
Bassi Maestro albums